Lucas Tanner is an American drama series that aired on NBC during the 1974–75 season.  The title character, played by David Hartman, was a former baseball player and sportswriter who becomes an English teacher at the fictional Harry S Truman Memorial High School in Webster Groves, Missouri, a suburb of St. Louis. He changed professions following the death of his wife and child. Episodes often deal with the resistance of traditional teachers to Tanner's unorthodox teaching style.

Regular co-stars included Rosemary Murphy, Kimberly Beck, and ten-year-old Robbie Rist. Unusually, the show was actually filmed in Webster Groves, rather than on a Hollywood backlot. That gave it a somewhat unusual "look" for a prime-time TV series.

A 90-minute pilot film of the series aired on NBC the week of May 4, 1974; the pilot also starred Kathleen Quinlan and Joe Garagiola.

This series was Hartman's last work as an actor. In November 1975, he began as co-host of ABC's Good Morning America. To date, he has not returned to acting.

Episodes

References

Tim Brooks & Earle Marsh, The Complete Directory to Prime Time Network and Cable TV Shows (7th ed. 1999), p. 601.

External links
 

1974 American television series debuts
1975 American television series endings
1970s American workplace drama television series
1970s American high school television series
English-language television shows
Tanner, Lucas
NBC original programming
Television series about educators
Television series by Universal Television
Television shows set in Missouri
Television shows set in St. Louis